Large proline-rich protein BAT3 is a protein that in humans is encoded by the BAT3 gene.

A cluster of genes, BAT1-BAT5, has been localized in the vicinity of the genes for TNF alpha and TNF beta. These genes are all within the human major histocompatibility complex class III region. The protein encoded by this gene is a nuclear protein. It has been implicated in the control of apoptosis and regulating heat shock protein. There are three alternatively spliced transcript variants described for this gene.

References

Further reading